An Alligator Named Daisy is a 1955 British comedy film directed by J. Lee Thompson and starring Donald Sinden, Jeannie Carson, James Robertson Justice, Diana Dors, Roland Culver and Stanley Holloway.

Plot
Returning from a cricket match in Ireland, Peter Weston (Sinden), an Englishman, is left with a pet alligator by another passenger who abandons it to him. Horrified, his first instinct is to get rid of it as soon as possible. However, he soon develops a bond with Moira (Carson), a young Irishwoman, which appears to be centred almost entirely around the animal. He soon discovers that Daisy is very tame and domesticated, and seems to be the way to Moira's heart.

Once back in London, Weston struggles to keep Daisy under control – as she upsets his family, loses him his job at a department store and imperils his relationship with his fiancée Vanessa (Dors). He plans to get rid of Daisy, but the police and a pet shop refuse to take her so he abandons her in Regent's Park, later returning with a sense of guilt to rescue her. Owing to a mix-up, Daisy is packed along with the rest of his luggage and accompanies him to his prospective father-in-law's country house. There, Daisy escapes and causes mayhem, while the arrival of Moira's "husband" produces a surprising outcome for all of them.

Cast
 Donald Sinden – Peter Weston
 Jeannie Carson – Moira O'Shannon
 James Robertson Justice – Sir James Colbrooke
 Diana Dors – Vanessa Colbrooke
 Roland Culver – Mr Weston
 Stanley Holloway – The General
 Avice Landone – Mrs Weston
 Richard Wattis – Hoskins
 Stephen Boyd – Albert O'Shannon
 Ernest Thesiger – Notcher (uncredited)
 Henry Kendall – Valet
 Michael Shepley – The Judge
 Wilfrid Lawson – Irishman (uncredited)
 Charles Victor – Sergeant (uncredited)
 George Moon – Al (uncredited)
 Margaret Rutherford – Prudence Croquet
 Joan Hickson – Piano Customer (uncredited)
 Jimmy Edwards – Alligator owner (uncredited)
 Frankie Howerd – Comedian (uncredited)
 George Woodbridge – PC Jorkins (uncredited)
 Colin Freear - Garage Boy (uncredited)

Production
The film was based on a novel published in 1954. Film rights were bought by Raymond Stross in November 1954. He wanted Diana Dors, Janette Scott and Kenneth Moore to star.

Filming took place at Pinewood Studios in May 1955. It was Dors' third movie with Thompson.

Critical reception
The TV Guide wrote, "This very funny film has an excellent supporting cast." The New York Times found that despite "a curiously cute bit by Margaret Rutherford, as a pet-shop owner who talks to the animals in their own "language."...the joke wears thin."

References

External links

An Alligator Named Daisy at BFI Screenonline
An Alligated Named Daisy at BFI
An Alligator Named Daisy at TCMDB
An Alligator Named Daisy at Letterbox DVD

1955 films
British comedy films
1955 comedy films
Films directed by J. Lee Thompson
Films about crocodilians
Films shot at Pinewood Studios
Films set in London
1950s English-language films
1950s British films